Jelena Abbou, née Jelena Đorđević, (born April 2, 1977) is a figure competitor model and personal trainer, born in Serbia and now living in the United States. She has also appeared in MAC advertisements.

Abbou grew up in Gornji Milanovac, Serbia.

Contest history 
 2001 NPC Women's Extravaganza - 5th
 2002 NPC East Coast Championship - 3rd
 2002 INBA Fitness Model Quest - 3rd
 2003 WNFB Worlds Natural Pro Figure - 5th
 2003 INBF Natural Monster Mash - Overall winner
 2004 WNBF Worlds Pro Natural Figure (New York City) - 1st
 2004 Northeast Classic Pro Figure - 2nd (and Ms. Photogenic)
 2004 Natural Atlantic Coast INBF Pro Figure - 1st
 2005 Ms. Buffalo Figure Championship - Overall winner
 2006 Junior Nationals, Class C, 8th Place

References

External links 
 

1977 births
Fitness and figure competitors
Living people